Tina Young Poussaint is a professor of radiology at the Harvard Medical School and a Neuroradiologist at the Boston Children's Hospital. In 2010 she served as President of the American Society of Pediatric Neuroradiology.

Early life and education 
Poussaint was born in Rochester, New York. Poussaint's father, Lionel W. Young, was a pediatric radiologist and her mother, Florence, is a retired podiatrist. Poussaint earned a Bachelor of Arts in mathematics and biology at Mount Holyoke College. She graduated magna cum laude and was elected to the Phi Beta Kappa honour society. For her graduate studies she moved to Yale School of Medicine, where she first met Valerie E. Stone. In their class at Yale there were three African-American women out of 102 students. As a medical student at Yale Poussaint was elected to the Alpha Omega Alpha. She graduated in 1983.

Research and career 
Poussaint completed her residency training in diagnostic radiology at the Massachusetts General Hospital, and was the first African American woman to do so. In 1989 she became the first African-American attending physician in radiology at Massachusetts General Hospital.

Poussaint joined the Department of Radiology at Boston Children's Hospital in 1993. She was made director of the Neuroimaging Center for the Pediatric Brain Tumor Consortium at Boston Children's Hospital in 2003. In 2011 Poussaint was made a full professor in radiology at the Harvard Medical School.  Her research considers the refinement of magnetic resonance imaging, with a focus on the diagnosis of brain tumors in children. She was made the inaugural Lionel W. Young Chair in Radiology at Boston Children's Hospital.

Awards and honours 

 2010 President of the American Society of Pediatric Neuroradiology
 2013 Inducted as a Fellow into the American College of Radiology
 2017 American Society of Pediatric Neuroradiology Gold Medal Award

Selected publications

Papers

Books

Personal life 
Tina Young married Alvin Poussaint in 1992. Her husband is a professor of Psychiatry at the Harvard Medical School.

References 

Living people
Year of birth missing (living people)
African-American women physicians
African-American physicians
Yale School of Medicine alumni
Harvard Medical School faculty
Mount Holyoke College alumni
American women academics
21st-century African-American people
21st-century African-American women